Trail Creek also known as Trail River is a stream in the Chugach Mountains near Moose Pass, Alaska. It flows through the Trail Lakes and ends at Kenai Lake. There is a USFS campground near where the river empties into Kenai Lake, the river can be fished in the late summer for various species of trout.

References

Rivers of the Kenai Peninsula
Rivers of Kenai Peninsula Borough, Alaska
Rivers of Alaska